Shooter's Hill or Shooters Hill may refer to:

Shooter's Hill or Shooters Hill, a district in the London Borough of Greenwich
Name of part of the A207 road in the Shooter's Hill area
Shooters Hill (New South Wales)
Shooters Hill, a settlement (hill) in Saint Andrew, Jamaica.